Michele Baranowicz (born 5 August 1989) is an Italian professional volleyball player of Polish descent. He was part of the Italian national team. At the professional club level, he plays for Top Volley Cisterna.

Personal life
Michele Baranowicz was born as Michał Baranowicz. He is a son of a former Polish volleyball player Wojciech Baranowicz, five–time Polish Champion.

Career

Clubs
In season 2010/2011 was a player of Asseco Resovia Rzeszów and won bronze medal of Polish Championship. In 2011 moved to Bre Banca Lannutti Cuneo. After one season moved to Casa Modena. He spent in this club one season. Since 2013 has been playing for Lube Banca Macerata. In 2014 won a title of Italian Champion after winning matches against Sir Safety Perugia.

Sporting achievements
 CEV Challenge Cup
  2015/2016 – with Calzedonia Verona
 National championships
 2005/2006  Italian Cup, with Bre Banca Lannutti Cuneo
 2013/2014  Italian Championship, with Cucine Lube Banca Marche Macerata
 2014/2015  Italian SuperCup, with Cucine Lube Banca Marche Treia
 2018/2019  Turkish SuperCup, with Halkbank Ankara

References

External links

 
 Player profile at LegaVolley.it 
 Player profile at PlusLiga.pl 
 Player profile at Volleybox.net

1989 births
Living people
People from Mondovì
Sportspeople from the Province of Cuneo
Italian people of Polish descent
Italian men's volleyball players
Italian Champions of men's volleyball
Italian expatriate sportspeople in Turkey
Expatriate volleyball players in Turkey
Italian expatriate sportspeople in Poland
Expatriate volleyball players in Poland
Resovia (volleyball) players
Modena Volley players
Volley Lube players
Blu Volley Verona players
Halkbank volleyball players
Setters (volleyball)